October Revolution House of Culture is a constructivist building in Zheleznodorozhny City District of Novosibirsk, Russia. It was built in 1927. The building is located on the corner of Lenin and Revolution streets. Architect: I. A. Burlakov.

History
The house was built in 1927 by the architect I. A. Burlakov.

From 1941 to 1944 the building was occupied by Leningrad Philharmonic Orchestra.

See also
 Gosbank Building
 Prombank Dormitory
 Polyclinic No. 1

References

Zheleznodorozhny City District, Novosibirsk
Buildings and structures in Novosibirsk
Buildings and structures completed in 1927
Constructivist architecture
Culture in Novosibirsk
Cultural heritage monuments of regional significance in Novosibirsk Oblast